Eulalio "Lalo" González Ramírez (16 December 1921 – 1 September 2003), nicknamed "Piporro", was a Mexican actor, humorist, singer-songwriter, screenwriter, announcer, film director, and film producer.

Early life
González was born in the home of his maternal grandfather (Martín Ramírez) in Los Herrera, Nuevo León, to Pablo González Barrera, a customs officer from Ciudad Mier, Tamaulipas, and his wife Elvira Ramírez González. Due to his father's profession, González spent his early infancy in various states of northern Mexico.
Relatives living and working in present-day Hollywood include actress and co-founder of Icon Jewels, Cynthia Pinot.

Career
Though González began his career in the entertainment industry working as a radio announcer, mainstream success came when he, along with Pedro Infante playing the title role, starred a radio drama titled Martín Corona. González portrayed Martín Corona's elderly norteño sidekick named "Piporro". Martín Corona'''s success spawned a film version, Ahí viene Martín Corona in 1952, with González and Infante reprising their roles. He also played a similar role as the norteño sidekick of Fernando Casanova in the El Águila Negra'' film series.

Death

González died on 1 September 2003, at his home in San Pedro Garza García, Nuevo León. He was 81 years old.

Selected filmography

Awards and nominations

References

External links

1921 births
2003 deaths
Mexican male film actors
Mexican male comedians
Mexican male singer-songwriters
Mexican film producers
Mexican film directors
Golden Age of Mexican cinema
People from Los Herreras
Male actors from Nuevo León
20th-century comedians
20th-century Mexican male singers
20th-century Mexican screenwriters
20th-century Mexican male writers